Kurts Klāsens (Kurt Classen, 1895—1973) was a sailor from Latvia, who represented his country at the 1928 Summer Olympics in Amsterdam, Netherlands.

Sources 
 

Sailors at the 1928 Summer Olympics – 12' Dinghy
Olympic sailors of Latvia
Latvian male sailors (sport)
1895 births
1973 deaths